The North Atlantic Division of the U.S. Army Corps of Engineers is one of the eight permanent divisions within the Corps. 

Made up of roughly 3,500 employees in six districts and a Division headquarters, the North Atlantic Division is a major subordinate command and serves to integrate the capabilities of its six districts. They plan, design and build for the Army and Air Force in the northeastern states and Europe, develop and manage water resources, and protect and restore the environment. They also work for other international, federal, state and local customers and agencies.

Division headquarters are at 302 John Warren Avenue  in Fort Hamilton in Brooklyn, New York. The division is responsible for six subordinate engineer districts with headquarters in Concord, Massachusetts, New York City, Philadelphia, Baltimore, Norfolk and Wiesbaden, Germany.

Following the American Civil War, rapid increases in civil works construction requirements to support economic growth drove the Army Corps of Engineers to establish many new engineer districts to manage the work. The Corps' national headquarters needed an intermediate level of command and control to manage the districts, so it created several division headquarters including the Northeast Division based in New York City in November 1888.

The Corps of Engineers reorganized in 1929 to reduce division headquarters and merged the Eastern Division with the Northeast Division, forming the North Atlantic Division. 

During World War II while working out of its headquarters at 270 Broadway in Manhattan, the division was responsible for coordinating all military construction in Europe. It also provided staff members and administrative support to the newly created Manhattan District's construction of nuclear bomb, which was code named the Manhattan Project because the district and division's offices being initially co-located.

The division commanding general is Maj. Gen. Jeffrey Milhorn, who is directly responsible to the United States Army's Chief of Engineers. Within the authorities delegated, the division commander directs and supervises the individual district commanders. The division commander also serves as the federal representative on the Delaware River Basin Commission, Susquehanna River Basin Commission and the Interstate Commission on the Potomac River Basin.

Engineer Districts

New England
New York
Philadelphia, Pennsylvania
Baltimore, Maryland
Norfolk, Virginia
U.S. Army Corps of Engineers, Europe District

List of Commanders
COL John Lloyd, 2022 -
MG Thomas Tickner, 2020 - 2022
MG Jeffrey Milhorn, 2018 – 2020
MG William H. Graham, Jr. 2015 – 2018
MG Kent D. Savre, 2012 – 2015
BG Peter A. DeLuca, 2009 – 2011
LTG Todd T. Semonite, 2006 – 2009
LTG William T. Grisoli, 2005 – 2006
MG Merdith W. B. Temple, 2002 – 2005
BG M. Stephen Rhoades, 1999 – 2002
LTG Jerry L. Sinn, 1997 – 1999 
MG Milton Hunter 1994 - 1997
BG Paul Chinen, 1992-1994
BG C Brown 1989-1992
MG James W. van Loben Sels, 1988-1989
MG Charles Williams, 1986-1988
BG Paul F. Kavanaugh, 1984-1986
BG Thomas Sands, 1981-1984
MG Bennett L. Lewis, 1979-1981
MG James Allen Johnson, 1977-1979
MG James Kelly, 1974-1977
MG Richard H. Groves, 1971-1974
MG Charles M. Duke, 1968-1971
BG Francis P. Koisch, 1966-1968
LTG David Stuart Parker, 1965-1966
BG John Dalrymple, 1962-1965
BG Thomas H. Lipscomb, 1959-1962
BG Clarence Renshaw, 1954-1959
BG Benjamin B. Talley, 1952-1954
COL Frederick Frech, 1950-1952
BG George J. Nold, 1948-1949
BG Beverly C. Dunn, 1946-1948
COL Charles L. Hall, 1945-1946
COL Albert H. Burton, 1944-1945
BG John Neal Hodges, 1940-1944 [Deployed to North Africa 21 May 1942 – 22 Sep 1943]
MG Francis Bowditch Wilby, 1938-1939
COL Edmund I. Daly, 1937-1938
MG Ernest Dichmann Peek, 1936-1937
COL George R. Spalding, 1935-1936
COL Gustave Lukesh, 1935-1935
COL James A. Woodruff, 1934-1935
COL George M. Hoffman, 1931-1934
COL William J. Barden, 1928-1931 [During Barden's command, the Northeast Division was merged with the Eastern Division and renamed the North Atlantic Division, part of major reorganization of the U.S. Army Corps of Engineers early in the Herbert Hoover administration]

Northeast Division commanders

COL Herbert Deakyne, 1925-1926
COL William B. LaDue, 1924-1925 and 1926-1927
COL Henry C. Newcomer, 1922-1924
COL Eden Everett Winslow, 1921-1922
COL James C. Sanford, 1920-1921
BG William C. Langfitt, 1919-1920
BG Theodore A. Bingham, 1917-1919
BG William T. Rossell, 1917-1918
COL Frederic Vaughan Abbot, 1913-1917
MG William Murray Black, 1909-1913
COL John G.D. Knight, 1907-1909
COL Amos Stickney, 1906-1907
COL Charles R. Sutter, 1901-1906
COL G.L. Gillespie, 1897-1901
BG John Moulder Wilson, 1895-1897
BG Henry Larcom Abbot, 1888-1895

References

External links

Interstate Commission on the Potomac River Basin

Divisions of the United States Army Corps of Engineers